Kristal Tin Yui Nei (born; 28 September 1977) is a Hong Kong singer and a former TVB actress.

Career 
Tin's career began with a first place in a singing contest in 1993. After the competition, she was offered a contract at Asia Television which she accepted. Two years later, Tin branched into acting through ATV.

In 2003, Tin decided to end her decade long relationship with ATV. Her time with the network saw her winning two Hong Kong Film Awards for Best Actress. She then worked as a radio host at Commercial Radio Hong Kong.

Tin formerly worked for TVB until her contract with TVB expired after 16 April 2020.

Personal life
Tin was married to Chapman To in June 2005. The couple have no children.

Filmography

Television

Films

Television presenting

References

External links
 
 
 

1977 births
Living people
TVB veteran actors
Hong Kong film actresses
Hong Kong television actresses
20th-century Hong Kong actresses
21st-century Hong Kong actresses
20th-century Hong Kong women singers